Cuilco is a municipality in the Guatemalan department of Huehuetenango. It is located in the Cuchumatanes mountains in the Southwestern portion of Huehuetenango. In 2018 it served approximately 57,000 people, most of them Ladinos (who are ethnically Mam Maya), living in over 100 aldeas and caserios, which are smaller communities served by the municipality. While most of the population identifies as Ladino, this was not the case many years ago, when most people identified themselves as Mam Maya. Nowadays it’s mainly people living in certain Aldeas like Aldea Cancuc, Aldea  
Chejoj, El Chilcal, and Aldea Shequemebaj who still identify as Maya. 
The municipality covers a total area of 592 km2. The dirt road connecting it to the Pan-American Highway has recently been improved and asphalted, which reduces travel times considerably. However, the highway ends at Cuilco, so travellers wishing to continue on to other parts of Guatemala or to Mexico still must navigate rough dirt roads. Given the poor condition of municipal roads, travel times may exceed 8 hours from one side to the other. Export crops include corn, coffee and panela. Panela is a molasses-like substance made from processing sugar cane.

Cuilco, as the municipality's head town, contains the municipal government housed in the municipal building near the center plaza of town.  As of 2007, the municipal building ("muni") employed approximately 15 people, providing many services to the surrounding villages and to Cuilco itself.

Tourism to Cuilco is fairly limited given its location more than 2 hours from Huehuetenango. The majority of Cuilco speak Spanish, the  Mam Maya language isn't spoken as much as it used to be before. 

Since the civil war started affecting Cuilco in the 1980s, many Cuilquenses have migrated to the Mexican state of Chiapas, and to the United States, mainly Indiantown, Jupiter, West Palm Beach, Immokalee, and Fort Myers Florida, as well as Mississippi, Illinois, Morganton North Carolina, Ohio, Marydel Maryland, and to California.

References

Municipalities of the Huehuetenango Department